Molendoa is a genus of moss in family Pottiaceae.

Species

The genus Molendoa contains the following species according to World Flora Online:

Molendoa andina 
Molendoa boliviana 
Molendoa burmensis 
Molendoa cucullata 
Molendoa duthiei 
Molendoa excelsa 
Molendoa fuegiana 
Molendoa herzogii 
Molendoa hornschuchiana 
Molendoa kitaibelana 
Molendoa ogalalensis 
Molendoa platyphyllum 
Molendoa roylei 
Molendoa schliephackei 
Molendoa sendtneriana 
Molendoa seravschanica 
Molendoa sordida 
Molendoa subobtusifolia 
Molendoa taeniatifolia 
Molendoa tenuinervis 
Molendoa warburgii

References

Pottiaceae
Taxonomy articles created by Polbot
Moss genera